Edson André Sitoe (born 8 September 1988), known as Mexer, is a Mozambican professional footballer who plays as a centre-back for Primeira Liga club Estoril and the Mozambique national team.

Brought to Europe by Sporting CP in 2010, he played 96 Primeira Liga games for Olhanense and Nacional. He then spent several years in the French Ligue 1, making over 150 appearances for Rennes and Bordeaux and winning the Coupe de France with the former in 2019.

A full international for Mozambique with over 50 caps since 2007, Mexer represented the country at the 2010 Africa Cup of Nations.

Club career

Portugal
Born in Maputo, Mexer began his career with Desportivo de Maputo. In November 2009, he and compatriot defender Zainadine Júnior had trials at Sporting CP in Portugal; at the start of the new year he signed for a fee of €173,000 and agreed a -year contract with the option of a further three.

On 24 February 2010, Mexer made his debut with a Sporting jersey in a reserve team match against Belenenses in the Liga Intercalar. In August, 50% interests on any future transfer revenue received by Sporting were sold to Traffic Group for €87,000, and he spent the 2010–11 season on loan to fellow Primeira Liga side Olhanense, making his competition debut on 11 September 2010 and playing six minutes in a 0–0 draw at precisely Sporting.

Mexer also played the 2011–12 campaign with the Algarve club, still owned by the Lions, and only missed six league matches as his team again managed to retain their status. In May 2012, he moved to Nacional also in the Portuguese top tier on a four-year deal. He scored his first professional goal the following 12 January, equalising in a 3–2 home win over Braga.

Rennes

On 19 June 2014, after a failed transfer to the French club in January, Mexer signed with Rennes on a three-year deal. In only his second appearance in Ligue 1, on 16 August, he contributed two goals in a 6–2 home victory over Evian.

In February 2016, despite consistent injuries, Mexer extended his contract until the summer of 2019. He took part in his first European competition in the 2018–19 UEFA Europa League, reaching the last 16.

Mexer played the full 120 minutes and scored the 2–2 equaliser against Paris Saint-Germain in the final of the Coupe de France on 27 April 2019, helping his team win the competition for the third time in their 118-year history after being down 2–0.

Bordeaux
After the expiration of his Rennes contract, Mexer was the subject of interest from Rangers of the Scottish Premiership, and met with manager Steven Gerrard. However, he opted to remain in France, signing a four-year deal at Bordeaux on 9 May 2019. In 2020–21, he was limited by recurrent thigh injuries.

On 26 September 2021, Mexer scored his first goal for the Girondins, a late equaliser in a 1–1 home draw against his previous club.

Return to Portugal
Mexer returned to Portugal in August 2022 eight years after leaving, with the 34-year-old agreeing to a one-year contract at Estoril.

International career
Mexer made his debut for Mozambique on 29 September 2007, in a 3–0 loss to Zambia in the semi-finals of the COSAFA Cup. In the following year's edition, he was part of the squad that came runners-up, but did not play in the final against South Africa. He represented the nation at the 2010 Africa Cup of Nations, a group stage elimination in Angola.

On 18 May 2014, Mexer scored his first international goal in a 5–0 home rout of South Sudan in the first leg of the first round of 2015 Africa Cup of Nations qualification.

International goals

Scores and results list Mozambique's goal tally first, score column indicates score after each Mexer goal.

Honours
Desportivo Maputo
Moçambola: 2006

Rennes
Coupe de France: 2018–19

Mozambique
COSAFA Cup runner-up: 2008

References

External links

Desportivo Maputo 2006–07 squad 

1988 births
Living people
Sportspeople from Maputo
Mozambican footballers
Association football defenders
GD Maputo players
Primeira Liga players
Sporting CP footballers
S.C. Olhanense players
C.D. Nacional players
G.D. Estoril Praia players
Ligue 1 players
Championnat National 3 players
Stade Rennais F.C. players
FC Girondins de Bordeaux players
Mozambique international footballers
2010 Africa Cup of Nations players
Mozambican expatriate footballers
Expatriate footballers in Portugal
Expatriate footballers in France
Mozambican expatriate sportspeople in Portugal
Mozambican expatriate sportspeople in France